Oxford University Handball Club (OUHaC) was founded and registered as a club at the University of Oxford in 2001, and has since established itself as one of England's most successful clubs. It is a member of the England Handball Association since 2002 and the Association of British Universities Handball Clubs since 2011. As such, the OUHaC plays both in the regular English Handball League (Championship) and the Cup. Since handball is not part of the BUCS, Oxford also plays in the EHA University Championships. From 2014 it plays in the varsity match against the Cambridge University Handball Club. In 2016 and 2017 respectively, the women's and men's teams were granted Half Blue status by the Blues committees of the University of Oxford.

Teams

Men's team
The men's team won the British Student Championship title in 2004, 2005, 2006, 2007, 2009, 2013 and 2014 as well as the English National League in 2006, being the first ever University Team in the history of English handball to win the National League Title. They have been too the first university team to compete in the EHF Challenge Cup (2006–07 and 2007–08). They have also won two mixed English Beach Handball tournaments. The team won the EHA League Cup in 2016 and reached the semi-finals of the EHA National Cup in 2017.

Women's team
The women's team was created within the club in 2003. The team's greatest achievements include winning the EHA National League 1st Division in 2015 and 2016 as well as the National University Championships in 2016. Moreover, the defeated the University of Cambridge in four consecutive Varsity matches from 2015 to 2018.

International competitions 
The men's team of the Oxford University Handball Club has participated twice in European competitions, the EHF Challenge Cup both in 2006 and 2007. They qualified for the first round as winners of the English league in 2006 and as winners of the cup in 2007.



National titles and seasons
Source:

References

Other links
University Sport Website
Club Website

English handball clubs
Handball Club
Handball clubs established in 2001